The Metropole Orkest (Metropole Orchestra) is a jazz and pop orchestra based in the Netherlands, and is the largest full-time ensemble of its kind in the world. A hybrid orchestra, it is a combination of jazz, big band and symphony orchestra. Comprising 52–97 musicians, it is versatile across many musical forms, and is equipped with a "double rhythm section" – one for pop and rock, and one for jazz based music.

History

The Metropole Orkest was founded in 1945 by Dolf van der Linden at the urging of officials from Netherlands Public Broadcasting, which manages and subsidizes the orchestra. The name of the group was suggested by one of the musicians. Dolf van der Linden led the ensemble for 35 years until he stepped down in 1980. He was replaced by Rogier van Otterloo, who led the group until his sudden death in 1988. Dick Bakker held the baton until 2005 when Vince Mendoza took over. He gave the orchestra a more international character. In August 2013 Jules Buckley took over the position of chief conductor from Vince Mendoza.

The Metropole Orkest is a regular feature at the North Sea Jazz festival and the yearly Holland Festival along with many TV and radio programs. The Dutch film and television industry relies heavily on the Metropole Orkest for its film scores. From 2005 to 2013 the Metropole was under the baton of four-time Grammy Award winner Vince Mendoza and performed frequently on the concert stage, at festivals and on recordings of both Dutch and international artists.

In European radio broadcasting, its closest counterparts are the BBC Concert Orchestra, and in particular the now defunct BBC Radio Orchestra which had the same instrumentation. The ensembles often performed with the same guest conductors and soloists, using the same bespoke arrangements.

The Metropole Orkest is known for its performances of world music and classic jazz works. It has worked with many prominent artists, including Ella Fitzgerald, Dizzy Gillespie, Al Jarreau, New York Voices, Tori Amos, Bono, Brian Eno, Hardwell, Elvis Costello, Within Temptation, Snarky Puppy, Marcus Miller, Todd Rundgren, Jacob Collier, Markus Stockhausen, Louis Cole, Triptykon, Cory Wong, Cory Henry, Basement Jaxx and Robbie Williams.

The Dutch government was considering withdrawing funding from the orchestra. At the last minute, in December 2012, politicians secured funding for the orchestra until 2017.

Starting January 31, 2017, an online survey was held to select a group for a joint project. 6 months later, Epica was elected from 650 suggestions, winning the most of 60,000 votes. Without revealing the title of the existing Epica song that was to be recorded, a joint studio session was scheduled to take place in Hilversum on December 13, 2017.

In the build-up to a Dutch parliamentary debate on the culture budgets, scheduled for 30 May 2018, the Metropole Orkest announced that by 2018 the subsidy budget cuts in the preceding years had caused a 50% reduction in the amount of work the orchestra could offer its musicians. Many of its musicians were no longer able to make a living from just their work at the orchestra, and faced problems combining the irregular work hours as a musician with part-time jobs needed to supplement their income. The orchestra objected to the situation as described, responding that it feared that the orchestra would diminish in quality or ultimately be forced to shut down completely.

Orchestral composition

Chief conductors
 Dolf van der Linden 1945–1980
 Rogier van Otterloo 1980–1988
 Dick Bakker 1991–2005
 Vince Mendoza 2005–2013
 Jules Buckley 2013–2020

Honorary conductors
 Vince Mendoza 2013 – present
 Jules Buckley 2020 – present

Permanent guest conductor
 Miho Hazama 2020 – present

Selected discography

Awards

In the 53rd Annual Grammy Awards of 2011, Best Instrumental Arrangement went to Vince Mendoza for arranging Carlos, a track from the album 54 which the Metropole had recorded with John Scofield.

In 1996, the Metropole Orchestra performed the score of Antonia, a film which won the Oscar for Best Foreign Language Film. They all also featured in "All Night Long" by Jacob Collier which won an award for the "Best Arrangement, Instruments and Vocals" at the 62nd Annual Grammy Awards.

References

External links

Musical groups established in 1945
Radio and television orchestras
Big bands
1945 establishments in the Netherlands
Dutch orchestras
Video game musicians
Music in Hilversum
Varèse Sarabande Records artists